Nov is an Israeli settlement and religious moshav in the southern Golan Heights, under the administration of Israel. Located to the east of the Sea of Galilee, it falls under the municipal jurisdiction of Golan Regional Council.

The international community considers Israeli settlements in the Golan Heights illegal under international law, but the Israeli and American governments dispute this.

History

The settlement was established in 1974 on the site of the farm Mazraat Nab that had about 330 inhabitants before it was depopulated in 1967. It was named after a village on the site mentioned in the Jerusalem Talmud. The site is mentioned in the 3rd century Mosaic of Rehob.

Notable residents
Effi Eitam

See also
Israeli-occupied territories

References

Religious Israeli settlements
Golan Regional Council
Moshavim
Religious Israeli communities
Populated places in Northern District (Israel)
Populated places established in 1974
1974 establishments in the Israeli Military Governorate